Ghurak, also rendered as Qurak, may refer to:
 Ghurak-e Olya
 Ghurak-e Sofla
 Ghurak-e Vosta

See also
 Gurak, Iran (disambiguation)